Skórzewo  is a village in the administrative district of Gmina Dopiewo, within Poznań County, Greater Poland Voivodeship, in west-central Poland. The name Skórzewo is shared with a neighbourhood of Poznań, adjoining the village across the city boundary.

The village has a population of 6,635.

References

Villages in Poznań County